A toxoid is an inactivated toxin (usually an exotoxin) whose toxicity has been suppressed either by chemical (formalin) or heat treatment, while other properties, typically immunogenicity, are maintained. Toxins are secreted by bacteria, whereas toxoids are altered form of toxins; toxoids are not secreted by bacteria. Thus, when used during vaccination, an immune response is mounted and immunological memory is formed against the molecular markers of the toxoid without resulting in toxin-induced illness. Such a preparation is also known as an anatoxin. There are toxoids for prevention of diphtheria, tetanus and botulism.

Toxoids are used as vaccines because they induce an immune response to the original toxin or increase the response to another antigen since the toxoid markers and toxin markers are preserved. For example, the tetanus toxoid is derived from the tetanospasmin produced by Clostridium tetani. The latter causes tetanus and is vaccinated against by the DTaP vaccine. While patients may sometimes complain of side effects after a vaccine, these are associated with the process of mounting an immune response and clearing the toxoid, not the direct effects of the toxoid. The toxoid does not have virulence as the toxin did before inactivation.

Toxoids are also useful in the production of human antitoxins. Multiple doses of tetanus toxoid are used by many plasma centers in the United States for the development of highly immune persons for the production of human anti-tetanus immune globulin (tetanus immune globulin (TIG), HyperTet (c)), which has replaced horse serum-type tetanus antitoxin in most of the developed world.

Toxoids are also used in the production of conjugate vaccines. The highly antigenic toxoids help draw attention to weaker antigens such as polysaccharides found in the bacterial capsule.

List of toxoids

References 

Immunology